Calvin Valen Leo Petrie (born 9 February 1984) is a Montserratian international footballer  and former mixed martial artist who plays for English club Epping Town, as a defender.

Career

Football
He has played club football for Haringey Borough, Wingate & Finchley, Waltham Abbey, Waltham Forest, Williamstown SC, FC Romania, Shoreham, Barkingside, Stotfold and Epping Town.

He made his international debut for Montserrat in 2011.

Mixed martial arts
Petrie began fighting in 2012, and went 3-0 as an amateur before two professional MMA fights in 2016, finishing with a record of 1-1.

Mixed martial arts record

| Win
| align=center| 1–1
| Ben Reeve
| TKO (punches)
| UCMMA 49
| 
| align=center| 1
| align=center| 0:23
| London, England
| 
|-
| Loss
| align=center| 0–1
| Benjamin Veverita
| KO (punch)
| UCMMA 48
| 
| align=center| 1
| align=center| N/A
| London, England
|

References

External links
 

1984 births
Living people
Montserratian footballers
Montserrat international footballers
Haringey Borough F.C. players
Wingate & Finchley F.C. players
F.C. Romania players
Shoreham F.C. players
Association football defenders
Montserratian expatriate footballers
Expatriate footballers in England
Montserratian expatriate sportspeople in Australia
Expatriate soccer players in Australia
English male mixed martial artists
Heavyweight mixed martial artists
Black British sportsmen